The Southwestern Conference is a high school conference in the St. Louis Metro East area. The conference participates in athletics and activities in the IHSA Illinois High School Association. The conference comprises large public high schools in the Metro East region of suburban St. Louis.

Current Membership

The current group of schools have been together since O'Fallon joined in 2000.

Sources:IHSA Conferences, IHSA Coop Teams, and IHSA Member Schools Directory

References

High school sports conferences and leagues in the United States
Illinois high school sports conferences
High school sports in Illinois